Madan Mohan Malaviya Park formerly known as Minto Park, is a park in Prayagraj, India. It is located in  the southern part of the city along the banks of Yamuna river. The park is a historical site for in 1858 Earl Canning read out the declaration of Queen Victoria's Proclamation (at 1 November 1858) which resulted in the complete transfer of control over India from The East India Company to the government of Britain. To commemorate the 50th anniversary of the event Earl of Minto installed a proclamation pillar in 1908. The marble pillar was topped with busts of Queen Victoria and Edward VII. In 1910 the park was named as Minto Park. After independence the marble busts atop the pillar were replaced by the Ashokan Lion Capital and park renamed as Madan Mohan Malaviya Park.

See also
 List of tourist attractions in Allahabad

References

Tourist attractions in Allahabad
Gardens in Uttar Pradesh
Memorials to Madan Mohan Malaviya